Arne Bogren is a Swedish sprint canoeist who competed for Brunnsviken's canoeing club in the late 1930s. He won a gold medal in the K-1 10000 m folding event at the 1938 ICF Canoe Sprint World Championships in Vaxholm.

References

Brunnsviken's canoeing club 100 years

Living people
Swedish male canoeists
Year of birth missing (living people)
ICF Canoe Sprint World Championships medalists in kayak